Planet Drum is a world music album by Mickey Hart, a musician and musicologist who was a member of the rock band the Grateful Dead.

Hart's concept for Planet Drum was to play drum music with percussionists from around the world, and incorporate their different musical styles and traditions into a new global sound. The musicians on the Planet Drum album were from the United States (Hart), India (Zakir Hussain and T.H. "Vikku" Vinayakram), Nigeria (Sikiru Adepoju and Babatunde Olatunji), Brazil (Airto Moreira and his wife, vocalist Flora Purim), and Puerto Rico (Giovanni Hidalgo and Frank Colón).

Planet Drum won the Grammy Award for Best World Music Album of 1991, the first year in which the award was given.  It reached number 1 on the Billboard chart for Top World Music Albums.

Planet Drum, the book

Hart also wrote a book called Planet Drum: A Celebration of Percussion and Rhythm, co-written by Fredric Lieberman and D.A. Sonneborn.  The book explores the role of drumming in the musical, cultural, and spiritual traditions of different cultures.  It was first published in 1991, the same year that the Planet Drum album was released, and has the same cover illustration by Nancy Nimoy.

Planet Drum, the band

Since Planet Drum was released, Mickey Hart has sometimes toured with many of the same musicians who played on the album, performing live concerts. This ensemble is also called Planet Drum.

Track listing

 "Udu Chant" (Sikiru Adepoju, Mickey Hart, Zakir Hussain, Airto Moreira) – 3:40
 "Island Groove" (Adepoju, Hart, Hussain, Moreira, Babatunde Olatunji) – 5:43
 "Light Over Shadow" (Moreira, Olatunji, Flora Purim) – 3:51
 "Dance of the Hunter's Fire" (Adepoju, Moreira, Olatunji, Colón, Purim, Hidalgo, T.H. "Vikku" Vinayakram) – 2:59
 "Jewe (You are the One)" (Olatunji) – 4:06
 "The Hunt" (Adepoju, Hart, Hussain, Moreira, Olatunji, Vinayakram) – 3:51
 "Temple Caves" (Adepoju, Hart, Hussain, Moreira, Olatunji) – 3:13
 "The Dancing Sorcerer" (Hussain, Moreira) – 2:57
 "Bones" (Hart, Hussain, Olatunji, Purim) – 4:10
 "Lost River" (Adepoju, Hart, Hussain, Moreira, Olatunji, Purim) – 2:58
 "Evening Samba" (Adepoju, Hart, Hussain, Moreira, Olatunji, Vinayakram) – 4:30
 "Iyanu (Surprises)" (Olatunji) – 2:02
 "Mysterious Island" (Hart, Moreira, Purim, Jeff Sterling) – 5:49

Personnel

Musicians

Sikiru Adepoju
Molonga Casquelord
Frank Colón
Mickey Hart
Giovanni Hidalgo
Zakir Hussain
Bruce Langhorne
Airto Moreira
Caryl Ohrbach
Babatunde Olatunji
Flora Purim
Gordy Ryan
Jeff Sterling
T.H. "Vikku" Vinayakram

Production

Producer – Mickey Hart
Co-producers – Sikiru Adepoju, Zakir Hussain, Airto Moreira, Babatunde Olatunji, Flora Purim, T.H. "Vikku" Vinayakram
Recording and mixdown engineers – Tom Flye, Jeff Sterling
Production manager – Howard Cohen
Equipment managers – Ram Rod, Rudson Shurtliff
Technical support – Jack Crymes
Digital mastering – Paul Stubblebine
Cover illustration – Nancy Nimoy

Notes

External links
Mickey Hart official web site
Mickey Hart: Planet Drum 1991

Mickey Hart albums
1991 albums
Rykodisc albums
Grammy Award for Best World Music Album
Albums produced by Mickey Hart